The 28th Guam Legislature was a meeting of the Guam Legislature. It convened in Hagatna, Guam on January 3, 2005 and ended on January 1, 2007, during the 3rd and 4th years of Felix P. Camacho's 1st Gubernatorial Term.

In the 2004 Guamanian general election, the Republican Party of Guam won a nine-to-six (9-6) majority of seats in the Guam Legislature.

Party Summary

Leadership

Legislative 
 Speaker: Mark Forbes
 Vice Speaker: Joanne M. Salas Brown
 Legislative Secretary: Edward J.B. Calvo

Majority (Republican) 
 Majority Leader: Antonio R. Unpingco
 Asst. Majority Leader: Ray Tenorio

Membership

References 

Politics of Guam
Political organizations based in Guam
Legislature of Guam